Bhale Huchcha is a 1972 Indian Kannada-language film directed by Y. R. Swamy and produced by Gopal Lakshman. It stars Rajkumar and Aarathi. This film was dubbed into Telugu as Dasara Picchodu and released in 1973.

Cast

 Rajkumar as Gopi
 Aarathi as Chandra
 Srinath as Naganna
 Sampath
 Vajramuni
 Thoogudeepa Srinivas as Sivakumar
 Dinesh
 Shakti Prasad
 Sriram
 Dr. Sridhara Rao
 Loknath
 Advani Lakshmi Devi
 Bangalore Nagesh
 Joker Shyam
 Y. R. Ashwath Narayana
 Comedian Guggu
 Mahadevappa
 Kunigal Ramanath
 Helen as cabaret dancer

Soundtrack
The music of the film was composed by the duo Rajan–Nagendra.

Track list

References

External links
 
 Bhale Huchcha songs
 Bhale Huchcha on Youtube

1972 films
1970s Kannada-language films
Films scored by Rajan–Nagendra
Films directed by Y. R. Swamy